Komlosy is a surname, simplified form of Hungarian surname Komlóssy. Notable people with the surname include: 

Aret Komlosy (born 1977), British-Nigerian singer/songwriter, actress, model, and producer
Irma Komlosy (1850–1919), Austrian painter